Dean Ljubančić (born 13 October 1969 in Rijeka) is a retired Croatian football player who played for Rijeka in the Yugoslav First League, Rijeka, Pazinka and Orijent in the Croatian First Football League, and Oldenburg in German Regionalliga Nord.

Ljubančić was the first player to score a hat-trick in the Croatian First Football League. He scored three times for Rijeka in a 3–0 victory over Istra on 2 May 1992. Ljubančić was also Rijeka’s joint league top-scorer in 1992.

Career statistics

Club

References

External links
 

1969 births
Living people
Yugoslav footballers
Croatian footballers
Croatian expatriate footballers
Yugoslav First League players
Croatian Football League players
HNK Rijeka players
HNK Orijent players
NK Pazinka players
VfB Oldenburg players
Expatriate footballers in Germany
Croatian expatriate sportspeople in Germany
Footballers from Rijeka
Association football forwards